The QF 14-pounder was a 3-inch medium-velocity naval gun used to equip warships for defence against torpedo boats.  It was produced for export by Maxim-Nordenfelt (later Vickers, Sons and Maxim) in competition with the Elswick QF 12-pounder 12 cwt and QF 12-pounder 18 cwt guns.

Service 
The gun equipped ships built in Britain for various foreign navies including Chile.

Victorian Navy service 
In 1900 they were removed, mounted on field carriages and went to China with the Victorian Naval Contingent to confront the Boxer Rebellion. These 2 guns were non-standard and fired QF fixed rounds (i.e. the cartridge was loaded with shell attached) unlike the standard guns which fired separate ammunition (i.e. shell and cartridge loaded as separate items). They were therefore left behind in China in favour of the standard QF 12-pounder.

In Victorian naval service in the 1890s the gun is reported as firing a shell weighing 14 lbs to a range of 8,000 yards with a muzzle velocity of 2100 ft/second, using a 6.5 lb black powder charge.

Victorian coastal artillery 
14-pounders were used for coastal defence at Fort Nepean, Fort Pearce and Fort Queenscliff.

British ammunition 
In British service the guns fired the same 3-inch 12.5 lb shell as QF 12-pounder guns.

See also 
 List of naval guns

Notes

References

External links 

 QF 14-pounder slide show at Friends of the Cerberus website

Naval guns of the United Kingdom
76 mm artillery
World War I naval weapons of the United Kingdom
Coastal artillery